Tonight We Raid Calais is a 1943 American film directed by John Brahm and starring John Sutton, Lee J. Cobb, and Annabella.

Plot summary

Geoffrey Carter (John Sutton), a young commando British intelligence officer, is sent into Nazi-occupied France as a one-man raid to destroy a munitions plant with help from a patriotic farmer, M. Bonnard (Lee J. Cobb). Carter confronts a French woman Odette Bonnard (Annabella) who hates the British and the Germans.

Cast 
 Annabella as Odette Bonnard
 John Sutton as Geoffrey Carter
 Lee J. Cobb as Bonnard
 Beulah Bondi as Mme. Bonnard
 Blanche Yurka as Widow Grelieu
 Howard Da Silva as Sgt. Block
 Marcel Dalio as Jaques Grandet
 Ann Codee as Mme. Grandet
 Richard Derr as German Captain (unbilled)
 other unbilled players include Sven Hugo Borg

Reception
Quentin Tarantino picked Tonight We Raid Calais as one of his five favorite World War II films. It was one of the films he discovered while doing research for his own World War II film, Inglourious Basterds.

References

External links 
 
 
 
 

1943 films
1940s war films
20th Century Fox films
American black-and-white films
American war films
Films about the French Resistance
Films directed by John Brahm
Films scored by Cyril J. Mockridge
Films scored by Emil Newman
Films with screenplays by Waldo Salt
World War II films made in wartime
American spy films
1940s English-language films